Benjamin Vaughan, better known as Benji Vaughan, is a British psychedelic trance musician and tech entrepreneur. He has released music under many names, of which most well known is his solo project, Prometheus, and his collaboration with Twisted Records label colleague, Simon Posford, under the moniker Younger Brother. His music is characterized by distinct basslines, high production quality, intense thematic development and unique or alternative approaches to the psytrance genre.  He frequently combines diatonic melodic content with metallic or "glitchy" percussive polyphonic elements to form thick contrapuntal tapestries of sound.  Although much of his music sounds like it was composed using equipment at the forefront of technology, it is not uncommon for him to use equipment now considered antique, such as the 1971 Korg micro synth that he used for portions of the second album, Corridor of Mirrors.

Benjamin Vaughan founded a tech startup, called Disciple. Disciple is a community media platform that, unlike Facebook or a website, empowers community hosts to build, manage and control their own private, social apps. The platform gives communities their own mobile meeting spaces to gather and interact in the ways that work for them.

Releases 
He has released three albums as Prometheus; Robot-O-Chan (2004), Corridor of Mirrors (2007), and Spike (2010). The albums have been well received by the trance community for their innovation, dancefloor appeal, and their incorporation of non-traditional influences. Robot-O-Chan features two down-tempo tracks, whereas Corridor of Mirrors maintains a consistent trance bent.

Younger Brother have released four albums to date, A Flock of Bleeps (released in 2003), The Last Days of Gravity (2007), Vaccine (2011) and Vaccine Electronic. Younger Brother’s musical output is much more varied than that of Prometheus, with tracks ranging from the psychedelic French ballad, "The Receptive," to progressive breakbeats such as "Weird on a Monday Night", to sounds reminiscent of Pink Floyd on their recent album.

On 2 September 2013, his debut solo album Even Tundra was released on Spotify and as a digital download.

References

External links
 

Living people
British record producers
British electronic musicians
Place of birth missing (living people)
1971 births
21st-century British businesspeople
British technology chief executives
British technology company founders
Younger Brother members